Laurent Dandrieu (born 12 July 1963 in Rome) is a French journalist, music and art critic.

Career 

Laurent Jacquet chose the pen name Laurent Dandrieu which (according to the Observatoire des journalistes et de l'information médiatique, he made up from the name of his fetish author), wrote in the magazine Reaction (1990–1994) and became a freelancer for Le Spectacle du Monde in 1994.

He also worked as a freelance writer for the cultural pages of the Valeurs actuelles weekly where he has been a film critic since 1998, then became the head of culture for the magazine in 1999 and then became deputy editor-in-chief, first responsible for culture, and since 2007, the debates / opinions pages, and from October 2009 to June 2013, editor of the valuesactuaries.com website. He is Associate Editor for pages related to society and in 2016 became editor of the culture pages.

Works 
2000: 
2013: 
2014: 
2015: 
2016: .
2017:

Chapters 
2000: Chapter ?, in Michka Assayas (dir.), Dictionnaire du rock : blues, country, folk, pop, reggae, rock indépendant, soul, Paris, Éditions Robert Laffont, series " Bouquins" 
2012: 
2002: 
2013:

Editions 
1997: 
1999:

References

External links 
 Laurent Andrieu, portrait d'un antimoderne on Valeurs actuelles
 VIDÉO Erwan Le Morhedec et Laurent Dandrieu débattent de l’identité chrétienne on La Croix (13 January 2017)
 Laurent Dandrieu : pour en finir avec le messianisme migratoire de l’Église on Breizh infos (21 January 2017)
 Laurent Dandrieu :Sur les migrants, l’Église se tire une balle dans le pied on Atlantico (20 January 2017)
 Films critics by  Laurent Dandrieu on Valeurs actuelles
 Dandrieu : « C’est l’engagement des catholiques au service de l’idée patriotique qui est visé » on Aleteia
 L'Église et l'immigration : le livre polémique de Laurent Dandrieu on YouTUbe

1963 births
Living people
20th-century French journalists
21st-century French journalists
French film critics
French Roman Catholic writers